Iowa, is a Belarusian pop rock music group (trio).

History 
Iowa is named after the album Iowa by the band Slipknot. In 2008, vocalist Ekaterina Ivanchikova sang in the musical The Prophet by Ilya Oleynikov. Iowa was formed in 2009 in Mahilyow. In 2010, after a series of concerts in St. Petersburg, the group decided to move to St. Petersburg, Russia where the band members live today.

Discography

Studio albums

Singles

Awards and nominations 
2012
New Wave: audience choice (won)
2013
  RU.TV Award: Best start of the year (nom)
 2015
 Muz-TV Award: Best Song, Breakthrough (nom)
  RU.TV Award: Dolce Vita (nom)
 Golden Gramophone Award  (won)
 Russian National Music Award: Best Song (nom), Best Pop Group (nom)
2016
 Muz-TV Award: Best Pop Band (nom)
 Russian National Music Award: Best Song (nom), Best Pop Group (nom)
2017
 Muz-TV Award: Best Pop Band (nom)
 Russian National Music Award: Best Pop Group (won)
2018
 Muz-TV Award: Best Pop Band (nom)
 Russian National Music Award: Best Pop Group (nom)

2019 

 Russian National Music Award: Best Pop Group (nom)

References

External links
 Official  site 
 Iowa on Yandex. Music
  RU TV channel
 YouTube channel

Musical groups established in 2009
Belarusian pop music groups
Indie pop groups
Pop rock groups
2009 establishments in Belarus
Russian National Music Award winners
Winners of the Golden Gramophone Award